The Phoenix Wings are a volunteer organization that financially assists the Ukrainian Army and collects donations to support it. It was established by the Ukrainian activist Yury Biryukov on March 27, 2014.

Activity 
Ukrainian army has heavy losses due to the Russian intervention in Crimea and Donbas. The foundation arose as an attempt to help and support the armed forces. Phoenix Wings mainly deal with technical support of the Armed Forces of Ukraine, but also delivers medicine to the wounded during the fighting, carries out restoration of buildings in which are based Ukrainian military, and so on.

The organization is also involved in the restoration of flying vehicles belonging to the Armed Forces of Ukraine. They helped to repair the aircraft AN-26, so the plane returned to the ranks of the Ukrainian army. The need for it has become particularly acute after the separatists in the Donbass destroyed transport aircraft IL-76, resulting in the deaths of 49 people who were on board.

During the entire period of the foundation, "Phoenix Wings" collected as donations over 60 million UAH. The organization purchased more than 1,000 articles of body armor. The fund also bought for the Armed Forces of Ukraine and continues to buy  bulletproof helmets and portable radios, special materials for fortification, spaced armour for infantry fighting vehicles, armored cars, etc.

The building housed the engineering and technical staff of the team.

According to the website "Prestupnosty.net" (2014), there are 20 permanent members in "Phoenix Wings", and the number of participants is growing.

References

External links 
 
 

Non-profit organizations based in Ukraine
Volunteer military formations of Ukraine
War in Donbas
Organizations based in Kyiv
Organizations established in 2014
2014 establishments in Ukraine